Alex Cook (born 2 May 1973) is an Australian mixed martial artist. He competed in the welterweight,  middleweight and light heavyweight divisions. 

Cook is a veteran of the Shooto and Pancrase organizations, making his debut in 1994 to a loss to Manabu Yamada at Pancrase: Road To The Championship 5. After frequent losses to Ken Shamrock and Masakatsu Funaki, Cook would later jump to Shooto with fellow Australian fighter and trainer Larry Papadopoulos with better success such as a win over Jutaro Nakao. He compiled a 4-2 record during his time in Shooto and would later depart the organization in 2000.

Mixed martial arts record

|-
| Win
| align=center| 6-5
| Alessandro Custodio
| TKO (submission to punches)
| SRF 12: Spartan Reality Fight 12
| 
| align=center| 2
| align=center| 1:00
| Gold Coast, Australia
| 
|-
| Win
| align=center| 5-5
| Ray Cooper
| Submission (neck crank)
| Shooto: R.E.A.D. Final
| 
| align=center| 1
| align=center| 1:44
| Urayasu, Chiba, Japan
| 
|-
| Win
| align=center| 4-5
| Isao Tanimura
| KO (punches)
| Shooto: R.E.A.D. 5
| 
| align=center| 1
| align=center| 1:27
| Tokyo, Japan
| 
|-
| Loss
| align=center| 3-5
| Tetsuji Kato
| Decision (unanimous)
| Shooto: Las Grandes Viajes 5
| 
| align=center| 3
| align=center| 5:00
| Tokyo, Japan
| 
|-
| Loss
| align=center| 3-4
| Hayato Sakurai
| Submission (rear naked choke)
| Shooto: Reconquista 4
| 
| align=center| 1
| align=center| 1:09
| Tokyo, Japan
| 
|-
| Win
| align=center| 3-3
| Jutaro Nakao
| Submission (rear-naked choke)
| Shooto: Let's Get Lost
| 
| align=center| 2
| align=center| 1:50
| Tokyo, Japan
| 
|-
| Win
| align=center| 2-3
| Tomoaki Hayama
| Technical Submission (arm-triangle choke)
| VTJ 1996: Vale Tudo Japan 1996
| 
| align=center| 2
| align=center| 6:23
| Tokyo, Japan
| 
|-
| Loss
| align=center| 1-3
| Masakatsu Funaki
| Submission (heel hook)
| Pancrase: Eyes Of Beast 4
| 
| align=center| 1
| align=center| 7:14
| Tokyo, Japan
| 
|-
| Win
| align=center| 1-2
| Katsuomi Inagaki
| Submission (heel hook)
| Pancrase: Eyes Of Beast 2
| 
| align=center| 1
| align=center| 9:23
| Yokohama, Kanagawa, Japan
| 
|-
| Loss
| align=center| 0-2
| Ken Shamrock
| Submission (heel hook)
| Pancrase: King of Pancrase Tournament Opening Round
| 
| align=center| 1
| align=center| 1:31
| Tokyo, Japan
| 
|-
| Loss
| align=center| 0-1
| Manabu Yamada
| Submission (armbar)
| Pancrase: Road To The Championship 5
| 
| align=center| 1
| align=center| 2:27
| Tokyo, Japan
|

See also
List of male mixed martial artists

References

External links
 
 Alex Cook at mixedmartialarts.com
 Alex Cook at fightmatrix.com

1973 births
Australian male mixed martial artists
Welterweight mixed martial artists
Middleweight mixed martial artists
Light heavyweight mixed martial artists
Living people